International Health and Medical Services (IHMS) provides primary and mental health care services within the Australian immigration detention network under a contract with the Department of Immigration and Border Protection. It is a subsidiary of International SOS.

IHMS traded as International Health And Medical Services Pty Ltd from 24 November 2003 and was initially registered as Sydney International Medical Clinic Pty Ltd in 30 March 2000.

Locations

North West Point Immigration Detention Centre, Christmas Island
Yongah Hill Immigration Detention Centre
Perth Immigration Detention Centre
Maribyrnong Immigration Detention Centre
Villawood Immigration Detention Centre

Outside Australian territory
Manus Regional Processing Centre
Nauru Regional Processing Centre

Transit accommodation
Adelaide Immigration Transit Accommodation
Brisbane Immigration Transit Accommodation
Melbourne Immigration Transit Accommodation

Standard of care
Concerns have been documented about the standard of care provided. Poor coordination between the Government of Australia and IHMS have been noted to contribute to poor outcomes for people in detention.

There have been questions about deaths in detention related to medical care, particularly:
Hamid Kehazaei
Faysal Ishak Ahmed

References

External links

Health care companies established in 2000
Health care companies of Australia
Immigration detention centers and prisons